Capital punishment was abolished in Guinea-Bissau in 1993. It last executed in 1986. In February 1993, the National People's Assembly (Guinea-Bissau) passed an amendment to the constitution which abolished the death penalty for aggravated murder and treason. 

Guinea-Bissau signed the Second Optional Protocol to the International Covenant on Civil and Political Rights on 12 Sep 2000, and ratified it on 24 Sep 2013.

References 

Guinea-Bissau
Law of Guinea-Bissau